Sutherland is an area in Highland, Scotland.

Sutherland may also refer to:

Places

Australia
 Sutherland, New South Wales, a suburb of Sydney
 Sutherland Shire, local government area in the Sydney region

Canada
 Sutherland, Saskatoon, a former town which was annexed by Saskatoon in 1956
 Saskatoon Sutherland, electoral district

Iceland
 Suðurland, one of the eight regions of the country

New Zealand
 Sutherland Falls, the highest falls in New Zealand

South Africa
 Sutherland, Northern Cape, hosts the country's astronomical observatory hub

United States
 Sutherland, Iowa
 Sutherland, Missouri
 Sutherland, Nebraska
 Sutherland, Utah
 Sutherland, Virginia
 Sutherland, Wisconsin

People 
 Clan Sutherland, a Scottish clan
 Earl of Sutherland, in the Peerage of Scotland
 Duke of Sutherland, in the Peerage of the United Kingdom
 Sutherland (surname), includes a list of people with the surname

Astronomy and spaceflight  
 Site of the South African Astronomical Observatory
 Sutherland Astronomical Society, based in Sydney, Australia
 Sutherland spaceport

See also
 Battle of Sutherland's Station
 HMS Sutherland, ships in the Royal Navy
 Pittsford Sutherland High School
 Sutherland House (disambiguation)
 Sutherland Secondary School
 Niles and Sutherland Report